Lex-XX is a compilation of remixes issued by Lex Records in 2021 and 2022 to mark the label's twentieth anniversary. Lex-XX is the third compilation on the label, following Lexoleum (2001-2003) and Complex (2011-2012) each released approximately a decade apart.

Each track from Lex-XX has unique artwork created by Commission Studio and Faux Mec. Artwork for each Track shows a digitally rendered object on a grid. The artwork for the "Gazzillion Ear" remix shows an illustration of a "handful of crystals and USB stick that DOOM used to deliver demos to Lex".

Background
The first Lex-XX remix released was King Krule's remix of Eyedress' sleeper hit track "Jealous". NME described the remix as "dark" and "hypnotic" and quoted King Krule saying the remix was "Recorded in sweat, last summer, for a friend." A video for the remix was released, Alternative Press  described it as "surreal" with "a retro video game vibe" where the musicians "set off on a ’90s Nintendo-style skateboard race through a bizarre Minecraft universe."

Boards of Canada began work on their "Treat Em Right" remix in 2016 while working on another remix for Nevermen, but didn't complete it until after they were asked to contribute a remix to Lex-XX. The remix samples Boards Of Canada's 1998 song "Open The Light" from their debut album Music Has The Right To Children.

The "Man On Fire Remix" is the second Thom Yorke remix of "Gazillion Ear". An earlier remix, subtitled "Monkey Hustle Remix" appeared as a bonus track on Born Like This.   Thom Yorke named the Lex-XX remix the "Man On Fire Remix". The remix dates to 2009 and Thom had previously played the remix on Benji B's BBC Radio 1 show in 2016.

Lex-XX track listing

References

Record label compilation albums
Electronic remix albums